Sauquoit Creek is a  river in New York, United States.  It lies within the southern part of Oneida County.  The creek flows eastward, then turns sharply and flows generally northward through the Sauquoit Valley to the Mohawk River, entering the river on the east side of Whitesboro. It is therefore part of the Hudson River watershed.

History 
The word Sauquoit is a form of spelling of the Oneida word Sa-da-quoit, which means "smooth pebbles in a stream".

The first cotton mills in the area were located on the Sauquoit at New York Mills in 1804.

Hydrology
The station has been in operation since September 2014.

Fishing 

Sauquoit Creek offers trout fishing along  of Public Fishing Rights easements. The stream is stocked annually approximately 6,000 yearling brown trout, in addition to 330 two-year-old fish. Wild brown and brook trout are found in the stream's headwaters.

Management 
The Sauquoit Creek Basin Intermunicipal Commission (SCBIC), which consists of municipalities, agencies and organizations who are signatories to an intermunicipal agreement, addresses issues related watershed management, flooding, and stormwater along Sauquoit Creek.

Communities along the creek 

Clayville
Sauquoit
Chadwicks
Washington Mills
New Hartford
New York Mills
Whitesboro

See also 
List of rivers in New York

References

Rivers of New York (state)
Mohawk River
Rivers of Oneida County, New York